Malik or Malak is a gotra of Jats found in Pakistan and India.

The Malik Jats were originally called Ghatwal (or Gathwala); they proudly started calling themselves malik ("lord"). They were zamindars (landowners) during the Mughal era.

References 

Jat clans of Haryana